Ernst Röthig (15 March 1906 – 31 May 1969) was a German fencer. He competed in the individual and team épée events at the 1936 Summer Olympics.

References

1906 births
1969 deaths
German male fencers
Olympic fencers of Germany
Fencers at the 1936 Summer Olympics